Mohamed Mouloud Harim (born November 8, 1985 in Tizi Ouzou) is an Algerian professional footballer who played as a midfielder for MC Saïda in the Algerian Championnat National.

Career
 2003–2005 JS Kabylie 
 2005–pres. MC Saïda

Honours
 Won the Algerian League once with JS Kabylie in 2004
 Finalist of the Algerian Cup once with JS Kabylie in 2004

References

1985 births
Living people
Kabyle people
Algerian footballers
Footballers from Tizi Ouzou
Association football midfielders
Algeria youth international footballers
JS Kabylie players
MC Saïda players
21st-century Algerian people